Derek Black is an American former white supremacist, the son of Don Black, founder of the Stormfront online community, and godson of former Ku Klux Klan Grand Wizard David Duke. He publicly renounced white nationalism and chronicled his personal journey away from his family's beliefs.

Early life and education
Derek Black was born in 1989 and grew up in West Palm Beach, Florida. He attended public school until third grade, when his parents took him out of school because his black teacher said the word "ain't". He was homeschooled and his education was centered on his family's beliefs. Homeschooling gave Derek and his father the chance to become closer. Don Black was able to take Derek with him to conferences, getting him more involved with their family beliefs.

At 10 years old, Derek Black began learning web coding, which later helped him create a page on the Stormfront site for children with similar ideas to his. He started a dedicated Lord of the Rings section on the site. He would receive critical emails and death threats, but his father would tell him not to look at the messages, and Derek has said that he was not bothered by what critics were sending him. From 2010 to 2013, he and his father hosted a radio show, the Don and Derek Black show, on Florida-based radio station WPBR/1340 AM, a white nationalist radio show covering national and local news.

After finishing high school, he enrolled in a community college and decided to run for a seat on the Republican executive committee. At 19 years old, he won the seat one of 111 seats with about 60 percent of the vote. The committee refused to seat him because he failed to take his oath.

He later decided that he had an interest in studying medieval European history, so in 2010, he went to the New College of Florida in Sarasota. The college was about a four-hour drive across the state and it was Derek's first time away from his home. He says of his first semesters: "I'd get up in the morning, and call into my dad’s radio show … and talk about the news … and then go to class and hang out with people who were often strong social justice advocates, and trying to live both of those lives was terrifying because I knew that one day somebody was going to type my name into Google."

Former beliefs
Until leaving home, Derek Black's worldview had developed within the insular world of white nationalism where there was never doubt about what whiteness meant in the U.S. Derek grew up strongly believing and promotingthe idea that America was a place reserved for white Europeans and sooner or later everybody else would have to leave. As a white nationalist, Derek did not believe that the white race was above all others but instead thought that the white race should not be surrounded by others. He was known for his suspicion of other races, the U.S. government, tap water, and pop culture. At age 10, he stated: "it is a shame how many White minds are wasted in that system". He told peers at New College that he was pro-choice on abortion, against the death penalty, and did not support the KKK or Nazism or white supremacy. Instead, Derek emphasized that there was a difference between white nationalism and white supremacy, saying his only concern was with "massive immigration and forced integration" and how it would lead to white genocide. He said he respected rights of all races but felt that they would be better off in their own homelands, not living together.

Renunciation of white nationalism
Once his beliefs and ongoing participation in promoting them became public knowledge at college, he was ostracized by most of the community. In May 2013, Derek Black started to befriend several Jewish people on campus, and gradually realized that his beliefs were wrong after attending multiple Friday night dinners with Jewish friends. 

He recalled of these dinners: 

In 2013, Derek wrote a public statement to the Southern Poverty Law Center, publicly renouncing his views. In a 2017 interview, he said: "I wanted them to know that I understood what we believed, and I was systematically disbelieving each point." Derek was very hesitant to "drive a wedge" in the relationship between himself and his family, especially his father.

When Don Black learned of Derek's renunciation of his beliefs, he began to distance himself from Derek, not being sure whether to defend him or to shun him completely. Derek tried to convince his father to re-examine his beliefs, but failed.

Family
Derek Black's mother, Chloe Black, is an executive assistant for the founder of the Florida Crystals company and owns a real estate business in Latin American countries. She has also served as spokeswoman for a charter school, Glades Academy in Pahokee, Florida, financed by Florida Crystals with the aim of lifting minority children out of poverty. Before her marriage to Don Black, she was married to David Duke.

His father, Don Black, who founded the website Stormfront, remains a white supremacist. He was also a Grand Wizard in the Ku Klux Klan, and a member of the American Nazi Party in the 1970s (for a time, the ANP was known as the National Socialist White Peoples' Party). In 1981, he was convicted of attempting an overthrow of the government of the island country of Dominica using firearms and served three years in jail, from 1981 to 1984.

Further reading

See also
 Talk radio
 List of white nationalist organizations

References

Living people
1989 births
People from West Palm Beach, Florida
New College of Florida alumni
Politics and race in the United States
White American culture in Florida
White nationalism in the United States
Former white supremacists